Jere L. Strittmatter (born April 11, 1950) is a former Republican member of the Pennsylvania House of Representatives.

He graduated from York Suburban High School in 1968 and from Franklin & Marshall College in 1972. He was first elected to represent the 97th legislative district in 1988. He was defeated in the 2002 Republican primary by Roy E. Baldwin

He is now a senior consultant at Triad Strategies, a Harrisburg lobbying and public relations firm.

References

External links
 official PA House profile

Living people
Republican Party members of the Pennsylvania House of Representatives
Pennsylvania lobbyists
1950 births